Puinave, Waipunavi (Guaipunabi) or Wanse is an indigenous language of Colombia and Venezuela. It is generally considered to be an unclassified language.

Varieties
Varieties listed by Mason (1950):

Puinave (Epined)
Western: Bravos, Guaripa
Eastern: Mansos
Macú
Macú
Tikié
Kerarí
Papurí
Nadöbo

Alternate names of Puinave are Puinabe, Puinavis, Uaipunabis, Guaipunavos, Uaipis.

Classification
Puinave is sometimes linked to other poorly attested languages of the region in various Macro-Puinavean proposals, but no good evidence has ever been produced. The original motivation seems to simply be that all of these languages were called Maku "babble" by Arawakans. Ongoing work on Puinave by Girón Higuita at the University of Amsterdam will hopefully clarify the situation.

Phonology

Consonants

Vowels

Syllable structure is (C)V(C); nasal syllabic nuclei cause allophonic variation of consonantal segments in the same syllable. The phonemes  have oral, non-sonorant allophones  in the onsets of syllables with oral nuclei.

The high vowel , when occurring in onset or coda position, is realized as a glide . Any glides  occurring before or  occurring after a nasalized nucleus are also realized as nasal .

Tone
Puinave distinguishes four surface (phonetic) tones: two simple (H and L) and two contour (HL and LH); these are analyzed as being composed of two phonemic tone values, H and L. Girón Higuita and Wetzels (2007) note that speakers seem to associate H with prominence, rather than increased duration or intensity (the typical correlates of prominence in languages like English).

Morphology and syntax
Jesús Mario Girón's description of the morphology and the function of nominalized constructions in this language can be found in The Linguistics of Endangered Languages (edited by Leo Wetzels).

Bibliography
Bautista Sánchez, E. (2008). Diccionario puinave-español y la oración gramatical. CIRCUI, Centro de Investigaciones de rescate cultural Puinave Autóctonas.
Girón, J. M. (2008). Una gramática del Wã́nsöjöt (Puinave). Amsterdam: Vrije Universiteit. (Doctoral dissertation).
Girón Higuita, J.M. and W. Leo Wetzels (2007). Tone in Wãnsöhöt (Puinave). Language Endangerment and Endangered Languages: Linguistic and Anthropological Studies with Special Emphasis on the Languages and Cultures of the Andean-Amazonian Border Area, W. Leo Wetzels ed., CNWS Publications.

References

External links

Puinave dictionary online (select simple or advanced browsing)
Puinave (Intercontinental Dictionary Series)

Indigenous languages of the South American Northeast
Languages of Venezuela
Language isolates of South America
Macro-Puinavean languages
Languages of Colombia